Boccaccio is a 1936 German historical musical film directed by Herbert Maisch and starring Albrecht Schoenhals, Gina Falckenberg, and Willy Fritsch. It was shot at the Babelsberg Studios in Berlin. The film's sets were designed by the art director Otto Hunte.

Plot
Boccaccio is an operetta that relates how  Nazis conceived the Italian Renaissance. The Ferrara's residents  are carried up in a tide of emotion and physical passion. Before long, the town is in chaos.

Background 
The film was produced by Universum-Film AG Berlin under the production management of Max Pfeiffer between mid-February and mid-April 1936 in the Ufa studios in Neubabelsberg and premiered on August 11, 1936 in the UFA-Palast (Berlin).

The film music was written by Franz Doelle, the lyrics by Charles Amberg. Individual songs such as "Bella Fiametta", "Alles, alles tu' ich aus Liebe" and "Radiant Sun" were published by Ufaton Verlag, interpreted by Charles Amberg.

Cast

References

Bibliography

External links
 
 Review
 Boccaccio Film

1936 films
1930s historical musical films
German historical musical films
1930s German-language films
Films of Nazi Germany
Films directed by Herbert Maisch
Operetta films
Films set in the 14th century
Films set in Italy
UFA GmbH films
German black-and-white films
1930s German films
Films shot at Babelsberg Studios